The Sigma Theta Tau International Honor Society of Nursing  is the second-largest nursing organization in the world with approximately 135,000 active members.

History
In 1922 six Indiana University students at the Indiana University Training School for Nurses (the present-day IU School of Nursing) founded Sigma Theta Tau at their dormitory in Indianapolis, Indiana. They were:

They had the support of the Director of the Indiana University Training School for Nurses, Ethel Palmer Clarke (served 1915-1931), who is noted by the Society as being "instrumental" in their endeavor.

The Founders' vision for the new honor society was to advance the nursing profession as a science, support nursing scholarship, and to recognize its leaders.

The society's name is derived from the initials of three Greek words: storga, tharos, and tima, which mean "love," "courage," and "honor."

In 1936 the organization "funded the first recorded research grant" for nursing in the United States. Since that time the organization has awarded more than $100,000 annually for nursing research around the world.

Sigma’s Center for Nursing Scholarship was constructed on the IUPUI campus in 1989. By 2014 the society’s membership had grown to 130,000 active members in more than eighty-five countries and territories.

Membership
More than 500,000 nurse scholars have been inducted into Sigma. It is the second largest nursing organization in the world. Its 580 chapters are located on more than 700 college and university campuses in the United States and countries including Australia, Botswana, Brazil, Canada, Colombia, China (Hong Kong), Eswatini, South Korea, Mexico, the Netherlands, Pakistan, the Philippines, South Africa, Taiwan, Tanzania and the United Kingdom. 

Membership is by invitation to baccalaureate and graduate nursing students, who demonstrate excellence in scholarship, and to nurse leaders exhibiting exceptional achievements in nursing. Sixty-one percent of active members hold master’s and/or doctoral degrees; 56% have a specialty certification; 48% are clinicians; 40% have more than 15 years of work experience; 21% are administrators or supervisors, and 20% are educators or researchers. In addition to English, members are fluent in 20 other languages including Spanish, Dutch and Finnish.

As for the honor system, in July 2019, the 176th inductee was accepted in the Hall of Fame during a formal induction ceremony in Calgary, Alberta, Canada, during the 30th International Nursing Research Congress, among other honorees coming from Sweden, Canada, Australia and the United States.

Student membership criteria
Graduate students (master's and doctorate) must have completed half of the nursing curriculum; 
achieve academic excellence (at schools where a 4.0 grade point average system is used, this equates to a 3.5 or higher); and meet the expectation of academic integrity. They must also be in the top 35 percent of their nursing program cohort.

Nurse leader membership criteria
Nurse leader candidates must be legally recognized to practice nursing in his/her country;
have a minimum of a baccalaureate degree or the equivalent in any field; and demonstrate achievement in nursing.

Initiatives
Sigma was one of the first organizations to fund nursing research in the United States. A US $600 grant awarded to Alice Crist Malone of Ohio State University in 1936 supported research to measure student achievement based on new curriculum objectives.

With its chapters and grant partners (corporations, associations, and foundations) the society contributes more than US $650,000 annually to nursing research through grants, scholarships and monetary awards. More than 250 research-oriented educational programs are sponsored or co-sponsored annually by Sigma in the United States and internationally. The honor society has underwritten more than 250 small or "seed" grants, which often begin a whole body of research. These peer-reviewed grants are often the first recognition of potent concepts that eventually lead to major, wide-scale research projects and innovation in the nursing profession.

Sigma also has a nursing research repository, the Virginia Henderson Global Nursing e-Repository, which offers nurses access to nursing research and evidence-based knowledge.

Publications
The society’s publishing arm produces two scholarly journals and numerous other publications.

Journals 
 Journal of Nursing Scholarship is the official journal of Sigma Theta Tau. It was originally titled Image when first published starting in 1967, then continued as Image: the journal of nursing scholarship from 1984 until 1999.
Worldviews on Evidence Based Nursing, a peer-reviewed, evidence-based nursing journal, is a bimonthly primary source of information to improve patient care circulated since 2004. Another periodical of Online journal of knowledge synthesis for nursing.

Books 
Books are published covering the themes among: career advice, clinical information, education resources, leadership support and training, research guides and tools, as well as technology insights and answers contrasted with publications on more general topics related to a nurse's lifestyle, society and culture, target readership consists of clinical nurses and faculty members as well as nurse leaders, from student or new nurse to researchers.

Since 2007, Sigma Theta Tau has been awarded annually a publishing merit by the American Journal of Nursing by the judging board of nursing executives, college professors and clinicians. In 2018, there were two titles awarded.

 - 2nd Place 2018 AJN Book of the Year
  - 2nd Place, 2018 AJN Book of the Year

Symbolism
The colors of the Society are Orchid and Fuschia.
The symbols of the society are six stars, representing the Founders, and the Lamp of Knowledge.

See also
List of nursing organizations
Evidence-Based Nursing
Alpha Tau Delta (professional fraternity, nursing)
Chi Eta Phi (professional fraternity, nursing)
American Association of Critical-Care Nurses (AACN), non-Greek letter, it is the largest nursing association in the world.

References

External links
 ACHS Sigma Theta Tau entry
Reflections on Nursing Leadership - Online magazine

Association of College Honor Societies
Nursing organizations in the United States
1922 establishments in Indiana
Honor societies
Student organizations established in 1922
Medical and health organizations based in Indiana